Kyle MacLean Kirkwood (born October 19, 1998) is an American auto racing driver. He is the currently set to drive the No. 27 for Andretti Autosport in the 2023 NTT IndyCar Series. He formerly drove the AJ Foyt Racing No. 14 entry during the 2022 NTT IndyCar Series.

Career

Karting
Born in Jupiter, Kirkwood began karting at a young age, often competing alongside fellow Jupiter native Oliver Askew. Throughout his karting career, he amassed multiple titles, including the AM Engines Formula Tag Junior championship in 2012, the SKUSA SuperNationals XVII - S5 Junior championship in 2013 and back-to-back wins at the Florida Winter Tour in 2015 and 2016.

Lower formula
In 2015, Kirkwood made his single-seater debut in the F1600 Championship with Chastain Motorsports. There he took victory in the season opener at Road Atlanta and contested a further six rounds to finish sixteenth.

Following his performance in Formula 4 United States, Kirkwood returned to the Formula Ford scene in 2016 to represent Team USA in the Formula Ford Festival and Walter Hayes Trophy event, finishing seventh and fourth overall in both respective events.

In 2016, Kirkwood joined the inaugural Formula 4 United States Championship with Primus Racing, which saw him claim a win at Mid-Ohio and finish third in the standings overall. In September 2016, Kirkwood was awarded with the Team USA scholarship.

After competing with them in pre-season testing at NOLA, Kirkwood returned to the championship the following year, switching to newcomers Cape Motorsports. He achieved nine victories, including back-to-back hat-tricks at Indianapolis and Motorsport Park, wrapping up the title in the Formula One supporting season finale at the Circuit of the Americas. During the season, Kirkwood was once again selected as a candidate for the Team USA scholarship.

International Formula 3
In August 2018, Kirkwood joined Abel Motorsports to contest the inaugural season of F3 Americas. The season saw Kirkwood claim fifteen of the seventeen race victories on offer and seal his third consecutive championship at NOLA with a round to spare.

The following year, Kirkwood made a one-off appearance with RP Motorsport in the season finale of the Euroformula Open Championship at Monza, which saw him take a best-placed finish of sixth in race two.

Formula E
In February 2020, Kirkwood was announced to be partaking in the rookie test at Marrakesh with BMW i Andretti Motorsport.

Road to Indy
In December 2016, Kirkwood partook in the Mazda Road to Indy Shootout, but lost out on the scholarship to Askew.

USF2000
In 2017, Kirkwood partook in the Chris Griffis Memorial Test with Swan-RJB Motorsports. In February 2018, he reunited with Cape Motorsports to contest the 2018 championship. In only his rookie season, Kirkwood dominated proceedings, taking twelve of the fourteen victories on offer and sealing his second title in a year at Mid-Ohio and equalling J. R. Hildebrand's record of wins across a season.

Indy Pro 2000
Kirkwood graduated to the championship in 2019, selecting RP Motorsport Racing as his team. After faltering in earlier rounds, Kirkwood took his maiden victories in both races at Road America. From the second race at Toronto onwards, Kirkwood dominated the season and won his fourth consecutive title at the season finale in Laguna Seca despite being taken out by Danial Frost.

Indy Lights
In December 2019, Kirkwood partook in the post-season test at Sebring with reigning champions Andretti Autosport. The following month, Andretti confirmed Kirkwood would race with them for the 2020 season, only for that year's running of the championship to be cancelled due to the COVID-19 pandemic.

Kirkwood won the 2021 Indy Lights Championship for Andretti Autosport. In doing so, he became the first driver to win a championship in every Road to Indy series.

IndyCar

Throughout 2021, Kirkwood was viewed with significant interest by different teams in the IndyCar Series paddock. Andretti Autosport owner Michael Andretti stated he intended to keep Kirkwood in the Andretti Autosport stable and reiterated this after Kirkwood won the Indy Lights championship. Andretti stated that he was considering moving Kirkwood to Formula E if a seat did not open up in IndyCar. 

As part of winning the Indy Lights championship, Kirkwood was guaranteed to compete in three IndyCar races in 2022, including the 2022 Indianapolis 500.

On November 10, 2021, it was announced that Kirkwood would drive the No. 14 entry full-time for A. J. Foyt Enterprises during the 2022 IndyCar Series season.  He had a best finish of 10th at Long Beach, and ranked 24th in points.

On June 1, 2022, Kirkwood and Andretti Autosport announced he would return to the Andretti stable for the 2023 season to replace the departing Alexander Rossi.

Sports car racing
With the 2020 Indy Lights season cancelled due to the COVID-19 pandemic, Kirkwood drove four races in the IMSA Prototype Challenge and also joined AIM Vasser Sullivan Racing for a limited GTD schedule.

Racing record

Career summary

† As Kirkwood was a guest driver, he was ineligible to score points.
* Season still in progress.

American open–wheel racing results

U.S. F2000 Championship

Indy Pro 2000 Championship

Indy Lights

IndyCar Series
(key) (Races in bold indicate pole position; races in italics indicate fastest lap)

Indianapolis 500

Complete IMSA SportsCar Championship results
(key) (Races in bold indicate pole position; races in italics indicate fastest lap)

* Season still in progress.

References

External links
  
 

1998 births
Living people
Racing drivers from Florida
U.S. F2000 National Championship drivers
Formula Regional Americas Championship drivers
Indy Lights drivers
Indy Lights champions
IndyCar Series drivers
Indianapolis 500 drivers
24 Hours of Daytona drivers
People from Jupiter, Florida
WeatherTech SportsCar Championship drivers
Indy Pro 2000 Championship drivers
Euroformula Open Championship drivers
RP Motorsport drivers
Andretti Autosport drivers
A. J. Foyt Enterprises drivers
United States F4 Championship drivers